Nguyễn Phúc Ngọc Vạn (1605-1656), was queen consort of Cambodia.  

She was the daughter of Nguyễn Phúc Nguyên and the chief queen of king Chey Chettha II. 

She is blamed by Cambodian sources for having pressed the king to give Saigon to the emperor of Vietnam and for the growing Vietnamese influence in Cambodia. 

She was instrumental in overthrowing the unpopular king Ramadhipati I by summoning Vietnamese troops to support her stepsons.

References

17th-century Cambodian women
Cambodian queens
17th-century Vietnamese women